The 2003–04 UEFA Champions League qualifying rounds decided 16 of the 32 teams which played in the group stage.
All times are CEST (UTC+2).

Teams

First qualifying round 
The draw for this round was performed on 20 June 2003 in Nyon, Switzerland.

Seeding

Summary
The first legs were played on 16 July, and the second legs were played on 23 July 2003.

|}

Matches

Pyunik won 2–1 on aggregate.

Sheriff Tiraspol won 2–1 on aggregate.

FBK Kaunas won 5–1 on aggregate.

Bohemians won 3–1 on aggregate.

Vardar won 4–2 on aggregate.

Leotar won 2–0 on aggregate.

HJK Helsinki won 1–0 on aggregate.

3–3 on aggregate. Sliema Wanderers won on away goals rule.

Omonia won 2–1 on aggregate.

3–3 on aggregate. Tirana won 4–2 on penalties.

Second qualifying round 
The draw for this round was performed on 20 June 2003 in Nyon, Switzerland.

Seeding

Notes

Summary
The first legs were played on 30 July, and the second legs were played on 6 August 2003.

|}

Matches

MTK Hungária won 3–2 on aggregate.

CSKA Sofia won 3–0 on aggregate.

Celtic won 5–0 on aggregate.

Slavia Prague won 4–1 on aggregate.

Shakhtar Donetsk won 2–0 on aggregate.

Žilina won 2–1 on aggregate.

Rosenborg won 5–0 on aggregate.

Dinamo Zagreb won 3–2 on aggregate.

Vardar won 3–2 on aggregate.

Anderlecht won 3–2 on aggregate.

3–3 on aggregate. Partizan won on away goals rule.

Wisła Kraków won 7–4 on aggregate.

Copenhagen won 10–1 on aggregate.

Grazer AK won 7–2 on aggregate.

Third qualifying round 
The draw for this round was performed on 25 July 2003 in Nyon, Switzerland.

Seeding

Notes

Summary
The first legs were played on 12 and 13 August, and the second legs were played on 26 and 27 August 2003.

|}

Matches

Sparta Prague won 5–4 on aggregate.

Celtic won 5–0 on aggregate.

Rangers won 3–2 on aggregate.

Marseille won 1–0 on aggregate.

3–3 on aggregate. Club Brugge won 4–2 on penalties.

Lokomotiv Moscow won 3–2 on aggregate.

Lazio won 4–1 on aggregate.

Dynamo Kyiv won 5–1 on aggregate.

Deportivo La Coruña won 1–0 on aggregate.

AEK Athens won 3–2 on aggregate.

Chelsea won 5–0 on aggregate.

Celta Vigo won 3–2 on aggregate.

1–1 on aggregate. Partizan won 4–3 on penalties.

Galatasaray won 6–0 on aggregate.

Anderlecht won 4–1 on aggregate.

Ajax won 3–2 on aggregate. Ajax won on silver goal

Notes

References

External links
 2003-04 season at UEFA website

Qualifying rounds
2003-04